Papurana kreffti is a species of true frog, family Ranidae. It is native to New Ireland and Buka Island (Papua New Guinea) and the Solomon Islands. The specific name kreffti honours Gerard Krefft, a German adventurer who settled in Australia and became there to be regarded as the father of Australian herpetology. Common names San Cristoval frog and San Cristobal treefrog have been coined for it.

Description
Females grow to at least  in snout–vent length. The snout is pointed. The tympanum is visible but moderate in size. The fingers are long and have oval or slightly pointed discs but no webbing. The toes are almost fully webbed and moderately sized, oval discs. The legs are relatively short. There is a conspicuous, cream-coloured labial stripe.

The male advertisement call sounds like a series of short squeaks and consists of 3–6 pulsed notes.

Habitat and conservation
Papurana kreffti is a common species in many areas and found inhabiting small, slow-flowing streams in lowland rainforest; it has also been recorded from wet grassy areas in disturbed habitats.

References

kreffti
Amphibians of Papua New Guinea
Amphibians of the Solomon Islands
Amphibians described in 1882
Taxa named by George Albert Boulenger